Jeter Deion Downs (born July 27, 1998) is a Colombian professional baseball shortstop for the Washington Nationals of Major League Baseball (MLB). He has played in MLB for the Boston Red Sox.

Early life and education
Downs was born on July 27, 1998, in San Andrés, Colombia. His father, Jerry Sr., had played professional baseball in Colombia. He was named for Baseball Hall of Fame shortstop Derek Jeter. To facilitate better baseball opportunities for him and his brother, Jerry Jr., the family moved to Miami, Florida.

Downs attended Monsignor Edward Pace High School in Miami Gardens, Florida, and played for the school's baseball team as a shortstop. He committed to attend the University of Miami on a college baseball scholarship.

Professional career

Cincinnati Reds
The Cincinnati Reds selected Downs with the 32nd overall selection of the 2017 MLB draft. He signed with the Reds for a $1.825 million signing bonus. After signing, he was assigned to the Billings Mustangs of the Rookie-level Pioneer League, where he spent all of his first professional season, posting a .267 batting average with six home runs and 29 runs batted in (RBIs) in 50 games. Downs spent the 2018 season with the Dayton Dragons of the Class A Midwest League where he hit .257 with 13 home runs, 47 RBIs, and 37 stolen bases in 120 games.

Los Angeles Dodgers
On December 21, 2018, the Reds traded Downs to the Los Angeles Dodgers, along with Homer Bailey and Josiah Gray in exchange for Matt Kemp, Yasiel Puig, Alex Wood, Kyle Farmer and cash considerations. He began 2019 with the Rancho Cucamonga Quakes and was selected to the mid-season California League all-star game and post-season league all-star team. He played in 107 games for Rancho Cucamonga, hitting .269 with 19 homers and 75 RBIs. The Dodgers promoted him to the Double-A Tulsa Drillers of the Texas League on August 20, 2019, where he hit .333 in 12 games with five home runs and 11 RBIs.

Boston Red Sox
The Dodgers traded Downs, Alex Verdugo, and Connor Wong to the Boston Red Sox in exchange for Mookie Betts, David Price and cash considerations on February 10, 2020. Downs did not play during 2020, due to cancellation of the minor league season. Following the 2020 season, Downs was ranked by Baseball America as the Red Sox' number two prospect.

Downs began the 2021 season in Triple-A with the Worcester Red Sox. In May, he was named to the roster of the Colombia national baseball team for the Americas Qualifying Event for the Olympics. He was selected to play in the mid-season All-Star Futures Game, where he went 1-for-2, driving in two runs with a double. In 99 games with Worcester, Downs batted .190 with 14 home runs and 39 RBIs. After the regular season, Downs was selected to play in the Arizona Fall League. On November 19, in advance of the Rule 5 draft, the Red Sox added Downs to their 40-man roster.

Downs began the 2022 season with Worcester. He was added to Boston's major-league active roster on June 20, despite only batting .180 in 53 games for Worcester. Downs made his MLB debut two nights later, playing third base and going 0-for-4 at the plate against the Detroit Tigers at Fenway Park. He was optioned back to Triple-A the next day. Downs was recalled to Boston on July 9, when Christian Arroyo was placed on the injured list. That evening, Downs collected his first MLB hit and RBI, and then scored the winning run in the bottom of the 10th inning against the New York Yankees. He hit his first major league home run on July 17 at Yankee Stadium. Downs was optioned back to Worcester on July 30, when Arroyo rejoined the team. In 14 games for the 2022 Red Sox, Downs batted .154 with one home run and four RBIs. In 81 Triple-A games with Worcester, he batted .197 with 16 home runs and 33 RBIs.

Downs was designated for assignment by the Red Sox on December 15, 2022.

Washington Nationals
The Washington Nationals claimed Downs off of waivers on December 22, 2022.

Personal life 
Downs' brother, Jerry Jr., played several years in Minor League Baseball.

References

External links

1998 births
Living people
Baseball players from Florida
Billings Mustangs players
Boston Red Sox players
Dayton Dragons players
Major League Baseball second basemen
Major League Baseball shortstops
Major League Baseball players from Colombia
People from Archipelago of San Andrés, Providencia and Santa Catalina
Rancho Cucamonga Quakes players
Scottsdale Scorpions players
Tulsa Drillers players
Worcester Red Sox players
Monsignor Edward Pace High School alumni
Indios de Mayagüez players